Larika Russell is a tennis player from the Bahamas. She was champion of the Mayagüez 2010 Central American and Caribbean Games.

Career 
The sports career of Larika Russell includes her participation in the following national and international events:

Mayagüez 2010 Central American and Caribbean Games 

She competed in the twenty-first edition of the games and won a total of 2 medals:
 Gold Medal: Doubles 
 Bronze medal: Single 
She had the second highest number of medals in the selection of Bahamas in Mayagüez 2010 Games.

ITF Junior Finals

Singles Finals (3–0)

Doubles finals (5–1)

See also 
 2010 Central American and Caribbean Games

References 

1985 births
Living people
Bahamian female tennis players
Tennis players at the 2010 Commonwealth Games
Commonwealth Games competitors for the Bahamas
Central American and Caribbean Games gold medalists for the Bahamas
Central American and Caribbean Games bronze medalists for the Bahamas
Central American and Caribbean Games medalists in tennis